This is a list of Swedish anti-aircraft  regiments, battalions, corps and companies that have existed in the Swedish Army.

By unit 

 Lv 1 Karlsborgs luftvärnsregemente (1942–1961)
 Lv 2 Östgöta luftvärnsregemente (1942–1962)
 Lv 2 Gotlands luftvärnsdivision (1963–1968)
 Lv 2 Gotlands luftvärnsbataljon (1968–1994)
 Lv 2 Gotlands luftvärnskår (1994–2000)
 Lv 3 Stockholms luftvärnsregemente (1942–1957)
 Lv 3 Roslagens luftvärnsregemente (1957–1994) 
 Lv 3 Roslagens luftvärnskår (1994–2000)
 Lv 4 Skånska luftvärnskåren (1942–1962, 1994–1997)
 Lv 4 Skånska luftvärnsregementet (1962–1994)
 Lv 5 Sundsvalls luftvärnskår (1942–1974) 
 Lv 5 Sundsvalls luftvärnsregemente (1974–1982) 
 Lv 6 Göteborgs luftvärnskår (1942–1962) 
 Lv 6 Göta luftvärnsregemente (1962–1994) 
 Lv 6 Göta luftvärnskår (1994–2000) 
 Lv 6 Luftvärnsregementet (2000– ) 
 Lv 7 Luleå luftvärnskår (1942–1975) 
 Lv 7 Luleå luftvärnsregemente (1975–1993) 
 Lv 7 Norrlands luftvärnskår (1993–2000)

See also 
 List of Swedish regiments

 List
anti-aircraft